The 2004 Nordic Golf League was the sixth season of the Nordic Golf League, one of four third-tier tours recognised by the European Tour.

Schedule
The following table lists official events during the 2004 season.

Order of Merit
The Order of Merit was based on prize money won during the season, calculated using a points-based system. The top four players on the tour (not otherwise exempt) earned status to play on the 2005 Challenge Tour.

See also
2004 Danish Golf Tour
2004 Finnish Tour
2004 Norwegian Golf Tour
2004 Swedish Golf Tour

Notes

References

Nordic Golf League
Nordic Golf League